The Malawi batis (Batis dimorpha) is a species of bird in the family Platysteiridae.
It is found in Malawi, eastern Zambia, and northern Mozambique.
Its natural habitat is subtropical or tropical moist lowland forests.

References

Batis (bird)
Birds described in 1893